Lunac may refer to:

 Lunac, Aveyron, a commune in the department of Aveyron in France
 Lunac (alloy and trans-ceramic coatings)
 Stearic acid, by trade name Lunac